The 2002 United States House of Representatives special election in Oklahoma's 1st congressional district was held on January 8, 2002 to select the successor to Steve Largent (R) who resigned to focus on his campaign for Governor of Oklahoma. Both of the major parties held primaries to determine their nominees. The Republican primary featured a competitive contest between then-First Lady of Oklahoma Cathy Keating, and state Senator Scott Pruitt, and the eventual winner state Representative John Sullivan. Sullivan subsequently defeated Tulsa School Board present Doug Dodd by a ten point margin. 

Given the strong conservative bent of the district, which voted for George W. Bush over Al Gore 62% to 38% in 2000 and has not been represented by a Democrat since 1987, Democrats did not seriously contest this race. Nevertheless, Dodd came within ten percentage points of winning the election, significantly outperforming Gore.

Election results

See also
List of special elections to the United States House of Representatives

References

1st congressional district special election
Oklahoma
2002
Oklahoma 2002
United States House of Representatives 2002 01
Oklahoma 01